Eric van de Poele (born 30 September 1961) is a Belgian racing driver and former Formula One driver. He participated in 29 Grands Prix, in 1991 and 1992. He is a three-times class winner at 24 Hours of Le Mans, and won three Formula 3000 races in 1990.

Driving career

After a difficult 1984 season in French Formula Three, van de Poele then won the Belgian and Benelux Formula Ford titles, also racing in the Belgian Touring Car Championship. He subsequently raced in German Touring Cars Championships, winning the 1987 championship despite not winning a race all season. He also won the 1987 Spa 24 Hours, sharing a car with Didier Theys and Jean-Michel Martin. He also dabbled in British Formula 3. For 1989, he moved up to Formula 3000, finishing fourth, and then runner-up in 1990.

After this, he signed for the Modena Formula One team for 1991, driving their Lamborghini cars thanks to backing from long-time sponsors LeasePlan. He qualified onto the grid at his third attempt, for the 1991 San Marino Grand Prix. There he impressed in the rain, running fifth in the last lap before the car ran out of fuel, dropping him to ninth. The team, in financial difficulties, was unable to build on this success, and van de Poele would not race again that year.

He then signed for Brabham in 1992, but the team were low on money. He qualified for the opening South African Grand Prix, finishing 13th, but did not manage to qualify the outdated car again. He frequently matched team-mate Damon Hill in the other Brabham, however. For the Hungarian Grand Prix he switched to the promising Fondmetal team. He qualified the car at the first attempt, only to spin out. He then started an excellent 15th for the Belgian Grand Prix, finishing 10th, and qualified again for the Italian Grand Prix, only for the clutch to break. After this, Fondmetal also hit money troubles and withdrew, leaving van de Poele without a drive.Aside from a largely unused capacity as test driver for Tyrrell in 1993, van de Poele has since found considerable success in Touring Cars and sports cars, winning the 12 Hours of Sebring in 1995 and 1996 and the Petit Le Mans in 1998. He has also added to his 1987 win in the Spa 24 Hours with four more wins in 1998, 2005, 2006 and 2008, giving him the record of five wins in the event. In 2008, van de Poele competed in the Rolex Sports Car Series.

Racing record

Complete Deutsche Tourenwagen Meisterschaft results
(key) (Races in bold indicate pole position) (Races in italics indicate fastest lap)

Complete International Formula 3000 results
(key) (Races in bold indicate pole position; races in italics indicate fastest lap.)

Complete Formula One results
(key) (Races in bold indicate pole position, races in italics indicate fastest lap)

† Driver did not finish the race, but were still classified as they completed 90% of the race distance.

Complete British Touring Car Championship results
(key) (Races in bold indicate pole position) (Races in italics indicate fastest lap)

Complete Spanish Touring Car Championship results 
(key) (Races in bold indicate pole position; races in italics indicate fastest lap.)

24 Hours of Le Mans results

Complete Grand Prix Masters results
(key) Races in bold indicate pole position, races in italics indicate fastest lap.

References

External links
Official website
Profile on F1 Rejects

1961 births
Living people
Belgian racing drivers
Belgian Formula One drivers
Modena Formula One drivers
Brabham Formula One drivers
Fondmetal Formula One drivers
French Formula Three Championship drivers
British Formula Three Championship drivers
Grand Prix Masters drivers
Deutsche Tourenwagen Masters drivers
Deutsche Tourenwagen Masters champions
Trans-Am Series drivers
British Touring Car Championship drivers
International Formula 3000 drivers
24 Hours of Le Mans drivers
24 Hours of Daytona drivers
American Le Mans Series drivers
European Le Mans Series drivers
Porsche Supercup drivers
World Sportscar Championship drivers
Blancpain Endurance Series drivers
24 Hours of Spa drivers
12 Hours of Sebring drivers
Peugeot Sport drivers
Schnitzer Motorsport drivers
BMW M drivers
Nismo drivers
Racing Bart Mampaey drivers
AF Corse drivers
Boutsen Ginion Racing drivers